The Gift is a 2019 Philippine drama television series broadcast by GMA Network. It premiered on the network's Telebabad evening block and worldwide on GMA Pinoy TV from September 16, 2019 to February 7, 2020, replacing Love You Two.

Series overview

Episodes

References

Lists of Philippine drama television series episodes